The 2004–05 season was Sporting Clube de Portugal's 97th competitive season, 71st consecutive season in the top flight of Portuguese football, and 98th year in existence as a football club.

Sporting CP's season began on 29 August 2004 with the first game of the Primeira Liga campaign, with a 3–2 home victory over Gil Vicente. Despite being top of the league at the half way mark of the season, and claiming home victories over rivals Benfica and Porto, the Leões finished in third place, four points behind league champions Benfica.

Aside from the Primeira Liga, Sporting CP also competed in the Taça de Portugal, where they entered the fourth round courtesy of their league position. After claiming straightforward victories over Naval 1º de Maio and Pampilhosa, Sporting CP were eliminated by Lisbon rivals Benfica in the sixth round. In a highly entertaining 3–3 game, the tie went to penalties which saw the Encarnados defeat the Leões 7–6 on penalties.

Given their third-place finish in the 2003–04 season, the Leões secured a place in the first round of the 2004–05 UEFA Cup. After progressing through the group stages, Sporting CP defeated Dutch side Feyenoord, and English sides Middlesbrough and Newcastle United to set up a semi-final tie against AZ. Despite taking a 2–1 lead into the second leg, the Cheese Farmers equaled the first leg result which led to extra time. After Kew Jaliens's 109th-minute strike which gave AZ the aggregate lead, Miguel Garcia scored a stoppage time goal to see Sporting CP progress to the final on the away goals rule. In the final taking place at the Estádio José Alvalade, Sporting CP met Russian side CSKA Moscow. Despite taking a first half lead, Sporting CP lost their advantage and conceded three second half goals to lose the final 3–1.

First team squad
Stats as of the end of the 2004–05 season. Games played and goals scored only refers to appearances and goals in domestic league campaigns.

Club
Coaching staff
{|class="wikitable"
|-
!Position
!Staff
|-
|Manager|| José Peseiro
|-
|rowspan="3"|Assistant Manager|| Eduardinho
|-
| Luís Martins
|-
| Pedro Caixinha
|-
|Goalkeeper Coach|| Fernando Justino
|-
|Training Coach|| Flávio Baia dos Santos
|-
|Scout|| João Ruas
|-
|Doctor|| Gomes Pereira
|-
|Kit man|| Paulinho
|-Other information

Pre-season and Post-season friendlies

Legend

Matches

Competitions

Primeira Liga

Standings

Matches
 Sporting-Gil Vicente 3-2
 1-0 Marcos António 
 2-0 Liédson 
 2-1 Marcos António 
 3-1 Liédson 
 3-2 Fábio 
 Vitória Setúbal-Sporting 2-0
 1-0 Jorginho 
 2-0 Albert Meyong 
 Sporting-Marítimo 0-1
 0-1 Gustavo Manduca 
 Rio Ave-Sporting 0-0
 Sporting-União Leiria 2-2
 1-0 Rogério 
 1-1 João Paulo 
 1-2 Fábio Felício 
 2-2 Beto 
 Estoril-Sporting 1-4
 0-1 Liédson 
 0-2 Liédson 
 1-2 João Paulo 
 1-3 Hugo Viana 
 1-4 Hugo Viana 
 Sporting-Belenenses 2-0
 1-0 Liédson 
 2-0 Roudolphe Douala 
 Penafiel-Sporting 0-3
 0-1 Liédson 
 0-2 Custódio 
 0-3 Liédson 
 Porto-Sporting 3-0
 1-0 Benni McCarthy 
 2-0 Diego 
 3-0 Carlos Alberto 
 Sporting-Boavista 6-1
 1-0 Roudolphe Douala 
 2-0 Hugo Viana 
 3-0 Hugo Viana 
 4-0 Custódio 
 4-1 Felipe Flores 
 5-1 Liédson 
 6-1 Mauricio Pinilla 
 Beira-Mar-Sporting 2-2
 1-0 Sunny Ekeh Kingsley 
 1-1 Roudolphe Douala 
 1-2 Bruno Ribeiro 
 2-2 Heitor

References

Sporting CP seasons
Sporting